Painting on Glass is the second studio album by The 3rd and the Mortal.

Track listing
 "Magma" - 4:25
 "Commemoration" - 5:41
 "Crystal Orchids" - 2:59 
 "Persistent and Fleeting" - 5:58  
 "White Waters" - 2:50  
 "Aurora Borealis" - 1:32  
 "Dreamscapes" - 4:31
 "Aurora Australis" - 2:39  
 "Azure" - 4:00
 "Veiled Exposure" - 5:22
 "Stairs" - 2:27  
 "Eat the Distance" - 7:11  
 "Vavonia, part II" - 7:23
 "Horizons" - 7:04

Credits

Band
 Rune Hoemsnes – Drums and percussion
 Bernt Rundberget – Bass-guitars
 Ann-Mari Edvardsen – Vocals, keyboards
 Trond Engum – Electric and acoustic guitars
 Geir Nilssen – Electric and acoustic guitars, keyboards
 Finn Olav Holthe – Guitar treatments, acoustic guitar, keyboards, tapes

Additional Musicians
 Ola Evensen – Trombone
 Lars Lien – Mellotron and ARP synth
 Oddrun Solberg – Church organ
 Aksel Hagen Tjora – Didjeridoo
 Sigurd Engum – Waterbucket
 Øyvind Klungseth Zalsen – Keyboards
 Monika Edvardsen – Additional vocals

References
Painting on Glass @ Encyclopaedia Metallum

1996 albums
The 3rd and the Mortal albums